Black Kat Kustoms is an American clothing line and custom parts shop based in Santa Ana, California. The company specializes in custom car, hot rod, and chopper clothing. The clothing line consists of mostly T-shirts, hooded sweatshirts, and beanie caps.

History
The company was founded in 2003 by punk legend, Mike Ness of Social Distortion and longtime hot-rodder, Don Nemarnik. Ness states in an interview that he formed Black Kat Kustoms because he "hated everything else" and wanted to design "kustom car, hot rod and chopper t-shirts, so I would have something cool to wear." Ness details his long-time love for designing punk style clothing in the Another State of Mind DVD commentary. He states that his graphic arts class was the only thing that kept him in school during his high school years.

The shop portion of the business is a place for Donnie and Mike to work on their own cars and bikes as a hobby which they occasionally sell.

See also
 Kustom Kulture

References

External links
 Official website

Clothing companies of the United States
Punk fashion
DIY culture
Companies based in Santa Ana, California